Erkel may refer to the following.

 Arjan Erkel (born 1970), Dutch medical aid worker
 Ferenc Erkel (1810–1893), Hungarian composer, who wrote the Hungarian national opera Bánk bán
Sándor Erkel (1846–1900), musician, Ferenc's son
 Erkel, a 1952 Hungarian film

See also Urkel